Englerina is a genus of flowering plants belonging to the family Loranthaceae.

Its native range is Tropical Africa.

The genus name of Englerina is in honour of Adolf Engler (1844–1930), a German botanist, it was first published and described in Bull. Soc. Bot. France Vol.42 on page 257 in 1895.

Species
Known species:

Englerina collinsii 
Englerina concinna 
Englerina cordata 
Englerina drummondii 
Englerina gabonensis 
Englerina heckmanniana 
Englerina holstii 
Englerina inaequilatera 
Englerina kagehensis 
Englerina kapiriensis 
Englerina kwaiensis 
Englerina lecardii 
Englerina longiflora 
Englerina luluensis 
Englerina macilenta 
Englerina muerensis 
Englerina ochroleuca 
Englerina oedostemon 
Englerina parviflora 
Englerina ramulosa 
Englerina schlechteri 
Englerina schubotziana 
Englerina subquadrangularis 
Englerina swynnertonii 
Englerina triplinervia 
Englerina woodfordioides

References

Loranthaceae
Loranthaceae genera
Plants described in 1895
Flora of West Tropical Africa
Flora of East Tropical Africa
Flora of South Tropical Africa